Mahella is a genus in the phylum Bacillota (Bacteria). The name Mahella derives from: New Latin feminine gender dim. noun Mahella, named in honour of the American microbiologist Professor R.A. Mah, for his important contribution to the taxonomy of anaerobes.

Species
The genus contains a single species, namely M. australiensis ( Bonilla Salinas et al. 2004, (Type species of the genus).; New Latin feminine gender adjective australiensis, related to Australia.)

See also
 Bacterial taxonomy 
 Microbiology

References 

Bacillota